Aalkkoottathil Thaniye  ) is a 1984 Malayalam film directed by I. V. Sasi, written by M. T. Vasudevan Nair, and starring Mammootty, Mohanlal and Seema.

Plot

Rajan is successful in his job, but his family life is not so happy. His wife, Nalini, aspires to receive a fellowship to Harvard University in the United States, leaving behind her husband and child, Babumon. When his father, Madhavan, a retired school teacher, is down with an ailment, Rajan, along with his family, returns to his ancestral home. Rajan's elder sister, Vishalam, younger sister, Seethalakshmi and husband Padmanabhan also arrive to meet their father, as his health condition is serious. Madhavan's daughters and in-laws are busy in their own ways, as they don't wish to spend many days with their dying father. In his sickness, Madhavan expresses his wish to meet his niece, Ammukutty. Ammu arrives and takes care of her dying uncle. Madhavan's children except for Rajan leave as Ammu is there to look after their father. Rajan remembers his young days of romance with Ammu.

Rajan and Ammu wish to marry each other. Ammu, an elementary school teacher, encourages him and sponsors him to enroll for Master's degree in Business Administration from the prestigious Cochin University. Rajan meets Anil Kumar at the university. Rajan secures a good job once he completes the course. But then, Rajan's boss Balachandran, who is Madhavan's disciple, wishes to marry his daughter Nalini to Rajan. Madhavan, in spite of knowing his son's and Ammu's love, insists that Rajan marry Nalini. Helplessly, Rajan obeys his father. Ammukutty desperately starts living alone separately in her house thereafter and continues her job.

Nalini goes to town from her ancestral home to attend her interview with Harvard University. Busy with his job, Rajan also wants to leave. Upon Ammu's request, he leaves his son with her. Babumon and Ammu become close and they spend those days happily.

Nalini passes the interview and is all set to go to the US. Knowing her son's relation with Ammu, she asks Rajan to bring Ammu as a servant to look after her son when she's away in the USA. Rajan tells her Ammu is the one who spent money for his higher studies. Nalini later tries to return the amount of money which Ammu spent for her husband. Ammu remorsefully shouts at her. Understanding his wife's fault, Rajan slaps her and reveals their unfruitful love story. Ammukutty later feels sorry for her words and advises Nalini.

Nalini repents for her rudeness and wishes to stay back in India with her family. But upon Ammu's insistence, telling not to lose a great opportunity, Rajan and Nalini unanimously decide to get Nalini to fly to the US for her fellowship. Madhavan's health slowly recovers. Rajan, Nalini and son happily go back, leaving Ammukutty again in her loneliness.

Cast

Mammootty as Rajan
Mohanlal as Anil Kumar
Seema as Ammukkutty
Balan K. Nair as Madhavan
Unnimary as Nalini
Lalu Alex as Padmanabhan
Sumithra as Seethalakshmi
Master Prasobh as Babumon
Kuthiravattam Pappu as Kutti Narayanan
Janardhanan as Balachandran
Adoor Bhasi as Achuthan
Sukumari as Cheeru
Shubha as Vishalam
Jalaja as Sindhu
 Kundara Johnny as Gopinath

Release
The film was released on 6 March 1984.

Box office
The film was commercial success.

Soundtrack
The music was composed by Shyam and the  lyrics were written by Kavalam Narayana Panicker.

References

External links
 
 

1980s Malayalam-language films
1984 romantic drama films
1984 films
Films with screenplays by M. T. Vasudevan Nair
Films directed by I. V. Sasi
Indian romantic drama films